Colin Blythe (30 May 1879 – 8 November 1917), also known as Charlie Blythe, was an English professional cricketer who played Test cricket for the England cricket team during the early part of the 20th century. Blythe was a Wisden Cricketer of the Year in 1904 and took more than 2,500 first-class wickets over the course of his career, one of only 13 men to have done so.

Blythe was a slow left-arm orthodox bowler and is considered to have been one of the great left-arm spin bowlers in cricket history. He played county cricket for Kent County Cricket Club between 1899 and 1914 and shares the record for the highest number of first-class wickets taken in a single day's play along with Hedley Verity and Tom Goddard. He took over 100 wickets in 14 of the 16 seasons he played, including 215 in 1909.

Despite having epilepsy, Blythe enlisted in the British army at the beginning of World War I. He was killed during the Second Battle of Passchendaele whilst on active service. A memorial at Kent's home ground, the St Lawrence Ground in Canterbury, is dedicated to him and to other members of the club who died in the war.

Early life

Blythe was born on 30 May 1879 in Deptford, at that time part of Kent. His paternal grandfather, originally from Rochester, had moved to the area to work as a shirtmaker and later ran a warehouse there. Blythe's father, Walter, was an engineer fitter and his mother, Elizabeth Dready, was the daughter of a cooper. They married in Kensington at Christmas 1878 when his mother was four months pregnant, returning to live in Deptford where Blythe grew up.

The eldest of thirteen children, Blythe was educated at Duke Street School close to his home, leaving in April 1892 just before his thirteenth birthday. At the time, Deptford was an overcrowded, industrial area which was relatively deprived. The growing size of his family probably prompted him to leave school at the earliest age possible and he became an apprentice engineer fitter and turner alongside his father at the Woolwich Arsenal. Blythe decided to study for a Whitworth Scholarship, but the pressure proved too much for his health and a doctor recommended that fresh air would aid his recuperation.

Until this point, Blythe appears to have played few, if any, organised cricket matches. He may have played cricket and football for boys clubs around Blackheath or for his school, but it appears that he did not bowl seriously before the age of 11 at the earliest. There is no evidence that he watched cricket until Saturday 17 July 1897 when Blythe, then aged 18, attended the third and final day of a county match between Kent and Somerset at Rectory Field, Blackheath, a ground relatively close to his home. When he arrived there were very few spectators—Blythe recalled that "I don't think there were that many more spectators than players"—and one of the Kent team, Walter Wright, came to bat in the nets and asked Blythe, as one of the few present, to bowl to him to give him some practice before play began. Blythe did so and was seen by William McCanlis, a former Kent cricketer who acted as coach and advisor to the team. Impressed by Blythe's bowling action, McCanlis arranged for him to bowl to him on another day.

McCanlis described his discovery of Blythe as involving "a considerable amount of luck", Deptford not being an area usually considered when searching for new talent. Shortly after, Blythe bowled to McCanlis at the latter's local cricket club and impressed him sufficiently that he was recommended for a trial at the Tonbridge Nursery where promising young professional cricketers were trained with a view to joining the Kent team. Blythe was successful in the trial and was taken on at the nursery for the 1898 season; the trials book recorded the verdict: "Bowls slow left. Very useful bowler." Blythe remained at the family home and continued his engineering job over the winter of 1897–98, but rented lodgings in Tonbridge for the 1898 cricket season, a pattern which continued until he married in 1907.

Kent cricketer

At the nursery

Blythe spent the 1898 season at Tonbridge, almost certainly the first time he had received formal cricket coaching. The regime for the nursery professionals consisted of net practice each morning, followed by further practice in the afternoon early in the season or, in later months, bowling at club members who requested it. The players also gained match practice by playing for local clubs which were able to request their service, and Blythe quickly developed the key cricketing skills, such as line-and-length bowling and variations in the flight and spin of the ball, he would use with great success throughout his career. By 1899, he was playing regularly for local clubs, bowling more than 600 overs and taking 105 wickets during the season, comfortably ahead of the other nursery bowlers. His batting, a skill which McCanlis recalled he had "no idea whatever" about when he began at the nursery, also developed.

Towards the end of August 1899, Blythe, then aged 20, was called into the Kent side and made his first-class debut against Yorkshire on 21 August 1899 at the Angel Ground in Tonbridge. Kent, enduring a poor season and whose bowlers had not performed effectively, began well and took early wickets. Yorkshire began to recover and Blythe was given the ball for the first time with the score 86 for the loss of four wickets. With his first delivery in first-class cricket, he bowled Frank Mitchell, who had scored 55 runs. Blythe played the remaining three games of the season, taking a further 12 wickets to finish with 14 at a bowling average of 22.14 runs per wicket. His best performance came against Surrey, when he took three wickets in each innings, after which The Times wrote that "Blythe, the new Kent left-hand slow bowler, seems a very promising man". Wisden Cricketers' Almanack, in its review of the 1899 Kent season, described him as a "new and promising" bowler, although "he has not yet done enough to justify one predicting a great future for him", whilst The Times, in its review, considered that he was a "bowler of great promise".

First-team regular
In 1900, Blythe played in all of Kent's 22 matches, taking 114 wickets and leading the Kent bowling averages as the county finished third in the 1900 County Championship, their best position in ten years. In his second match of the season, he had first innings figures of five for 71 against Gloucestershire, the first time he took five wickets in an innings. Further five-wicket returns followed against Middlesex and Yorkshire, and by early August he had taken 56 wickets in 14 games at an average of just over 22 runs per wicket. In the first match of Canterbury Cricket Week, when Kent played Lancashire, Blythe took eleven wickets for 72 runs in the match in helpful bowling conditions, including six for 40 in the first innings, his best bowling figures to date. Although the match was drawn, the crowd cheered Blythe and held a collection for him in appreciation of his performance; both the local and national press also praised his bowling in the game, The Times writing that he had "bowled superbly". The rest of the season brought a string of successes: in the last eight games, he took 58 wickets at an average of 14.50 and finished the season with 11 five-wicket returns and two 10-wicket matches, including twelve wickets in the game against Worcestershire.

Blythe benefited from Kent's recently instituted winter pay for their professionals; the scheme had begun in 1897, following a similar model to that used by Yorkshire, but the 20 shillings-a-week payment was not enough to live on and Blythe returned to work at the Woolwich Arsenal and to live in his family's home for the winter months. He was ill for part of the winter and was ordered by Kent to spend two weeks recuperating by the sea. Although it is uncertain what the nature of the illness was, one of his biographers, Christopher Scoble, speculates that it may have been related to his later epilepsy, or that he was affected by the attention brought about by his successful first full season.

The weather during the 1901 season was dry, leading to a succession of hard pitches which made batting easy and did not play to Blythe's bowling strengths. In these conditions, he was less effective and took fewer wickets at a higher average: in first-class cricket he secured 93 wickets at 23.12, the only full-season in which he played when he did not take at least 100 first-class wickets. When conditions favoured his bowling, however, he had success, for example taking seven for 64 against Surrey, and even on good batting pitches Blythe made it difficult for batsmen to score quickly and generally conceded few runs. He remained a nominal member of the Tonbridge Nursery, and played a handful of matches there during the season.

Test match debut

The good impression that Blythe had made during his first two seasons led to his selection for an English team to tour Australia organised by Archie MacLaren. Two of the leading English professional bowlers, Wilfred Rhodes and George Hirst, were refused permission to join the tour by their county, Yorkshire, so MacLaren chose Blythe and several other promising cricketers. Kent allowed Blythe to join the tour but withheld his winter pay. Scoble suggests that he enjoyed the tour and "took part fully in the social aspects", including playing his violin with the ship's band during the voyage to Australia. In his first game of the tour, he took five for 45 against South Australia, and when he made his Test match debut on 13 December 1901, he took three for 26 in the first innings and four for 30 in the second, The Times reporting that he "bowled splendidly". After his performance, in what was to be the only England Test victory of the tour, Blythe was presented with a gold pocket watch engraved with his bowling figures.

Blythe took four for 64 in the first innings of the second Test, but after this his performances fell away and he took only six wickets in the last three Tests, hampered after splitting a finger on his left hand. He generally conceded few runs, but Australian pitches did not favour his bowling style, and the injury to his bowling hand meant he could not turn the ball as much as usual. Wisden suggested that Blythe worked hard, albeit in a weak bowling attack, and his 18 Test match wickets were taken at an average of 26.11. His health benefitted from the tour, and he returned physically stronger than before.

No longer required to train before the season at the Tonbridge Nursery, Blythe was successful in the 1902 season, when he was assisted by a wet summer which led to a series of damp, rain-affected pitches. He took 127 wickets at 15.47, including his best figures so far, eight for 42 against Somerset, and finished second in the Kent bowling averages. Although he was not chosen to play for England against the touring Australians, The Times wrote that his performance during the season was "far in advance of anything he has previously done for the county".

Leading cricketer

Growing fame

Another wet season in 1903 aided Blythe's bowling and he took 142 first-class wickets at an average of 13.75, his best return in terms of wickets and average so far. He was the "mainstay" of Kent's bowling attack and by the end of the season, The Times was proclaiming him as "certainly one of the best slow medium left-handers at the present day". Kent began the season badly and only rallied in August, when Blythe took over 70 wickets. Beginning with nine for 67 in an innings against Essex in Canterbury week at the start of August―the first of six times he took nine wickets in an innings―Blythe had a string of successful performances, including taking five for 13 from just 4.3 overs against Surrey as part of a spell in which he took 25 wickets in four innings spread across four days. Kent finished eighth in the Championship, with Blythe taking a wicket in every match he played in, the beginning of a remarkable sequence in which he took at least one wicket in each match he played in until August 1909. The domestic season was followed by Kent's short tour of the United States, Blythe taking ten wickets in the two first-class matches played in America. In the 1904 edition of the almanack, Wisden chose Blythe as one of the Cricketers of the Year for the 1903 season, its review of the season having said that "nothing stood out as prominently as the bowling of Blythe".

A drier summer in 1904 resulted in fewer pitches which favoured Blythe's bowling, and his 138 wickets came at the higher average of 19.60. He showed again that he could perform on harder pitches and slow the run-scoring of batsmen when necessary, bowling for an hour against Sussex at Tunbridge Wells in a high-scoring match without conceding a run. His wickets generally came steadily, although against Hampshire he took thirteen wickets for 91 in June and then fifteen for 76 in a single day's play on a wet pitch at Canterbury in August, including nine for 30 in the first innings. He also began to show more potential as a batsman: against Nottinghamshire, he scored 82 not out, sharing a partnership of 106 for the ninth wicket with Bill Fairservice; batting at number four against Yorkshire he scored 42 not out; and against Somerset he scored 70 in an hour out of a last-wicket partnership of 98 with Fairservice. In total, he scored 400 first-class runs, improving by nearly 150 runs on his previous best, and his batting average reached 15.38, the only time he averaged more than 15 in an English season. More than one critic claimed that Blythe could have become a good batsman had he so wished, but he never batted as consistently again, and preferred hard-hitting in the lower order to serious batting. At the end of the season he was the subject of one of the prestigious front-page profiles in Cricket magazine, and The Times wrote that Blythe had "strong claims to be considered the best left-hander of his pace".

The following season, Blythe had his most successful season to date, taking 149 wickets at 21.08 as Kent finished sixth in the County Championship in 1905―he took 68 more wickets than any of Kent's other bowlers. He had another success with the bat, scoring 75 and sharing a ninth wicket partnership of 120 with Fairservice, and had several successful games with the ball, taking 10 wickets in a match five times. That season, the Australian cricket team toured England, playing five Test matches. Wilfred Rhodes, the established England left-arm spin bowler, missed the third Test with a finger injury, and Blythe, in the opinion of The Times "very likely a better bowler", replaced him to make his only Test appearance of the season and his first on home soil. He took four wickets, including three quick wickets in the Australian second innings which nearly tilted the match, which was drawn, in England's favour. Wisden commented that he "got on admirably" and "bowled uncommonly well", although Rhodes returned to the side for the final two matches.

Second overseas tour and County Champions
Blythe was selected by the MCC to tour South Africa over the 1905–06 English winter. The English team was not particularly strong and featured only three players, including Blythe, who had played against Australia the previous season, although Wisden was of the view it was "good enough" for the task, albeit short of a fast bowler. In contrast to his previous tour, Blythe requested that Kent continue his winter pay, suggesting that he would not go otherwise. The Kent committee only agreed after a majority vote, although the influential committee chairman Lord Harris supported Blythe. In South Africa, Blythe was successful, taking over 100 wickets in all games, including 57 in first-class matches, and thrived on the matting pitches used at the time in the country. He was one of the few English bowling successes in the Test matches, playing in all five matches and taking 21 wickets at 26.09. South Africa won the series 4–1; in the only Test won by England, Blythe took eleven for 118, including his first five-wicket returns in Test matches: six for 68 and five for 50.

After finishing third in 1904 and in sixth-place in 1905, Kent won the County Championship for the first time in 1906. Blythe took 111 first-class wickets at 19.90 in the season, but was hampered by injury which prevented him reaching 100 wickets in the Championship for the first time since 1901 and the last time in his career. Against Sussex, he split the second finger of his bowling hand and missed three games; attempting to return too soon, he split the finger again and missed four more matches. During the time he was not playing, he received half-pay, and his place was taken by a 19-year-old debutant, Frank Woolley, who became one of Kent's greatest players. He returned for the final eleven Championship matches of the season, all of which Kent won to clinch the title in a tight finish. Against Surrey at Blackheath, considered the turning point of Kent's season, he "won the game for Kent with some brilliant bowling on an easy batting wicket"―taking five for 25 from 20 overs as Surrey were bowled out for 80 in their second innings―and the team went in to the final Championship match of the season against Hampshire needing only a draw to secure the title; Blythe took six wickets in each innings and Kent, who scored 610 runs when they batted, won by an innings.

Following their victory, the team were widely acclaimed, particularly within Kent, and the Kent Committee chose to award the professionals a bonus of £10, rather less than a week's wage for Blythe. At the suggestion of Lord Harris, the Committee commissioned a painting by Albert Chevallier Tayler of one of the season's matches. The main conditions were that it should be set on St Lawrence Ground in Canterbury, and should include Blythe as the bowler; the painting, Kent vs Lancashire at Canterbury, became well-known and has been hung in the pavilions at Canterbury and at Lord's Cricket Ground.

1907–1909
In the 1907 County Championship match at the County Cricket Ground, Northampton, Kent defeated Northamptonshire by an innings and 155 runs. Kent had batted first, having won the toss, and had then dismissed Northants for 60 and 39. The story of the match is that it was dominated by, first, the weather and then by Blythe. The first day was Thursday, 28 May, Blythe's 28th birthday. Play could not commence until mid-afternoon and then three hours were possible before more rain intervened. Kent won the toss, batted first and reached 212 for 4. On the Friday, no play was possible because of persistent rain. The weather relented on Saturday morning and Kent were able to continue their innings. Their tactics were simply to score as many as possible as quickly as possible and they added 42 in forty minutes to reach an all out 254 with more than an hour to go before lunch. On a wet but drying wicket, Blythe was in his element. He opened the bowling from the pavilion end and, in sixteen overs, shattered Northants with a career-best return of 10 for 30. Northants had to follow-on but, with Blythe taking seven for 18, their second innings lasted only thirty overs, so Blythe had taken 17 wickets in a single day's play. Frank Woolley was playing and he recalled in his memoir that Blythe was unlucky not to take all twenty wickets in the match (this has never been done in first-class cricket). He says Blythe was affected by dropping an absolute "sitter" off his own bowling but that was in the first innings, not the second. The first wicket in the second innings was taken by Bill Fairservice so the all-twenty goal was never on once that wicket fell.

Blythe's best Test bowling performance was eight for 59 (fifteen for 99 in the match) against South Africa at Headingley in the 2nd Test of the 1907 series.

Kent were unable to retain their championship title and slipped to eighth place in the 1907 final table, having won twelve of their 26 matches. Blythe had one of his best seasons individually, especially his performances at Northampton and Headingley. He took 183 wickets, the same as George Hirst, and only George Dennett with 201 took more. Blythe's average improved to 15.42 and placed him fifth among the bowlers with 100 wickets. His ten for 30 at Northampton was his best innings return. He achieved 5wI seventeen times and 10wM six times.

Blythe made his second tour Australia, this time with MCC, in 1907–08. He played in eleven first-class matches and took 41 wickets at 22.80 with a best return of six for 48. He achieved 5wI three times and 10wM once.

Kent had a very good season in 1908 and were placed second behind Yorkshire, who were unbeaten in 28 matches. The crucial match was Kent's season opener at Bradford Park Avenue where Yorkshire won by nine wickets. Only 249 runs were scored in the entire game. Kent also lost to Hampshire and Surrey in August. Blythe had an outstanding season and, for the first time, was the country's leading wicket-taker, his 197 putting him well clear of George Hirst (174). Blythe's average was 16.88 (seventh among bowlers with 100 wickets); his best innings return was eight for 83; he achieved 5wI twenty times and 10wM six times.

Having performed with great credit in 1908, Kent won the 1909 title in fine style, losing only two of their 26 matches. Blythe took 215 wickets, 48 wickets more than anyone else, and he was again the national leader. His average of 14.54 was second among bowlers with 100 wickets, behind Schofield Haigh's 13.95. Blythe's best innings return was nine for 42. He achieved 5wI 23 times and 10wM seven times.

Senior professional
Blythe made his second tour of South Africa in his last overseas season in 1909–10. He played in ten first-class matches and took 50 wickets at 15.66 with a best return of seven for 20. He achieved 5wI three times and 10wM once.

Blythe took two hat-tricks in his career, both of them within the same fortnight at the end of June and the beginning of July 1910. Kent retained the title with a new but short-lived percentage system (wins to matches played) working in their favour. They won nineteen of 25 matches for 76.00% and were well clear of runners-up Surrey who won sixteen of 28 for 57.14%. Blythe took 175 wickets and was second after Razor Smith (247). His average of 14.26 was third-best among the bowlers who took 100 wickets, after Jack Hearne and Razor Smith. Blythe's best innings return was seven for 53; he achieved 5wI eighteen times and 10wM four times.

The 1911 County Championship was the first to award points for first innings lead and it created controversy for Kent who finished marginally second behind Warwickshire. If the 1910 system had been retained, Kent would have won a hat-trick of titles. The key match was their nine-run defeat by Surrey at The Oval in late August which, subject to Warwickshire winning their final match, decided the outcome. Blythe took 138 wickets at 19.38 with a best analysis of eight for 45. He achieved 5wI ten times and 10wM ten times. He had the seventh-highest number of wickets and the fifth-best average.

Kent had another good season in 1912 but championship success eluded them and they finished third behind Yorkshire and Northants, but as in 1911, they would have won the title under the 1910 percentage system. They won fourteen of their 26 matches. Blythe had his best season in statistical terms as he was both the leading wicket-taker and top of the bowling averages. He took 178 wickets at 12.26 with a best return of eight for 36. He achieved 5wI sixteen times and 10wM eight times.

In 1913 Kent won their fourth championship in eight seasons with twenty victories in 28 matches. Blythe again topped the bowling averages with 16.34 but his tally of 167 wickets was third-highest behind Major Booth (181) and Bill Hitch (174). Blythe's best bowling return was seven for 21; he achieved 5wI fifteen times and 10wM three times.

Wartime, military service and death

The final season
After the start of World War I in early August 1914, cricket continued to be played, although public interest declined and the social side of the game was curtailed. Blythe took ten wickets against Sussex and eight against Northants during Canterbury Week at the beginning of the month. Dover week was moved to Canterbury as The Crabble was being converted to a military camp, and in his final game on the ground Blythe took eleven wickets against Worcestershire, including seven for 20 on a drying pitch to win the match for Kent. In his final match of the season, played at Lord's, he took another seven wickets, including five for 77 in the first innings, his 218th five-wicket haul. At 35 years of age, Blythe finished the season as the leading county wicket-taker with 170, but did not play in Kent's final match of the season at Bournemouth; war had intervened.

Military service

Despite his epilepsy, Blythe enlisted in the Kent Fortress Royal Engineers (KFRE) at the end of August alongside Kent teammates David Jennings and Henry Preston as well as his close friend Claud Woolley and Jennings' brother Tom. As a trained engineer, Blythe's skills lent themselves to service in the KFRE, and after initial training at Tonbridge, the men were posted to the Gillingham depot as part of 2/7 company, a Territorial Force company. Blythe's enlistment was covered by the press and whilst at Tonbridge he undertook a recruiting tour of Kent, enlisting another 25 men. He was promoted to corporal by the end of the year and to serjeant in 1915.

After spending the first years of the war working on coastal defences and other construction projects around Kent, the introduction of conscription in January 1916 meant that territorials were required to sign Imperial Service Obligations and were liable to be sent overseas. Wartime cricket matches, firstly for the KFRE and later for other sides, occupied some of Blythe's time. The side played matches against the Royal Engineers, a South African XI and Chatham Garrison amongst others in 1916, and Blythe played at Lord's and The Oval and against a Linden Park side containing four of Kent's players.

Blythe and Claud Woolley were identified for overseas service in early 1917, were transferred to the Royal Engineers and underwent training at Marlow in Buckinghamshire. Blythe played more cricket whilst at Marlow, playing alongside Woolley and Jennings. His final appearances at Lord's saw him playing against the Australian Imperial Forces and then, in his final match, for an Army and Navy side against an Australian and South African XI. He took only one wicket, Australian international Charlie Macartney. By this time Blythe was certain that he would not be able to play cricket professionally after the war, and was appointed as cricket coach at Eton College, intending to take up the position once the war was over.

Blythe was posted to the 12th battalion of the King's Own Yorkshire Light Infantry (KOYLI), a pioneer battalion which had been raised in Leeds and consisted mostly of Yorkshire miners. He embarked for France in September. Working in the Ypres Salient sector of the front, the battalion was mainly engaged in laying and maintaining light railway lines to allow easy passage of men, equipment and munitions across the area during the Battle of Passchendaele. On 8 November 1917 Blythe and Woolley were part of a working party on a railway line between Wieltje and Gravenstafel. Shrapnel from a shell burst pierced Blythe's chest, killing him instantly; the same burst wounded Woolley.

Memorials

Blythe is buried in the Oxford Road Commonwealth War Graves Commission Cemetery near Ypres. His headstone bears the inscription, chosen by his wife, "In loving memory of my dear husband, the Kent & England cricketer". A memorial to him and the other members of Kent's sides who died during the war was erected at the St Lawrence Ground in Canterbury in 1919. The idea of a memorial was discussed by the Kent Committee as early as December 1917, subject to approval by his widow, and noted in The Times in April 1918. The memorial, which initially took the form of a drinking fountain, was unveiled by Lord George Hamilton in August 1919. Inscribed in block letters on the west face of the plinth was the dedication: "To the memory of Colin Blythe of the Kent Eleven who volunteered for active service upon the outbreak of hostilities in the Great War of 1914–18 and was killed at Ypres on the 18th Nov 1917. Aged 38 he was unsurpassed among the famous bowlers of the period and beloved by his fellow cricketers". The date was wrong: Blythe was killed on the 8th.

The memorial was originally sited on the Old Dover Road side of the ground, just inside the main entrance and next to a memorial to Fuller Pilch. It was removed from its initial site during redevelopment of the ground in the early 21st century and restored. It was rededicated, with a corrected inscription, inside the Nackington Road entrance of the ground in 2017 on the centenary of Blythe's death. Pelham Warner, who had played with Blythe for England and was a great admirer of his, laid a wreath at the memorial during the 1919 Canterbury Cricket Week, beginning a tradition which has continued.

Blythe is also commemorated by a decorative mural in Tonbridge Parish Church, on the town's war memorial and has a road in North Tonbridge named after him. Both the Tonbridge mural and the Canterbury memorial were designed by Walter Cave, the vice-president of the Royal Institute of British Architects. Two of Blythe's wallets, torn by the shrapnel which killed him, are on display inside the pavilion at Canterbury.

Style and technique

Off the field, Blythe played the violin and Harry Altham, writing in Barclay's World of Cricket, said that his slow left-arm action "reflected the sensitive touch and the sense of rhythm of a musician", the left arm emerging from behind his back "in a long and graceful arc". Blythe, who had complete mastery of flight and spin, bowled consistently to a full-length and made effective use of his fingers at the point of delivery to determine if the ball would be an orthodox break or a late inswinger, either of which was a difficult ball to face on a pitch that helped the bowler. Although he was ostensibly a slow-paced bowler, Blythe sometimes bowled an "arm ball" which was decidedly fast and, in general, he had more pace than would be expected.

In his Golden Ages, A. A. Thomson praised Blythe as Wilfred Rhodes' "historic rival as a slow left-hand bowler". Thomson declared Rhodes and Blythe to have been "the greatest of slow left-hand bowlers" but stated a slight personal preference for Rhodes. He qualified his opinion by admitting that many better judges, including Ranjitsinhji, considered Blythe to be "the more difficult to play (against)". As well as Ranji, all the leading batsmen greatly respected Blythe and Gilbert Jessop wrote in his book A Cricketer's Log that his particular bêtes noires as bowlers were Blythe, Monty Noble and Tom Hayward.

Blythe is depicted as the bowler in Albert Chevallier Tayler's oil painting, Kent vs Lancashire at Canterbury, commissioned by Kent at the suggestion of Lord Harris to commemorate the club's first official County Championship title in 1906. Harris made two conditions: the ground had to be Canterbury; the bowler had to be Colin Blythe. Harris' choice of Blythe for this honour is echoed in Altham's history: "But when all is said, it is the figure of 'Charlie' Blythe that stands out above his fellows as the greatest factor in the county's success".

Altham went on to say that Blythe elevated bowling "from a physical activity onto a higher plane" and summarised him as "practically unplayable" on a "sticky wicket". Technically, Altham says, Blythe's strengths were "the quickness of his break and rise (of the ball) from the pitch, combined with his perfect length".

Personal life
Blythe met Janet Gertrude Brown, who was from Royal Tunbridge Wells, in 1906. She was called Janet by her own family but Blythe and everyone in his family called her Gertrude so, like him, she had two familiar names. Born in February 1889, she was ten years younger than Blythe. They were married on 11 March 1907 at the registry office in Greenwich. The couple lived in Tonbridge, not far from the Angel Ground. They had no children. Before his marriage, Blythe had continued to live with his family during the off-season. They had moved from Deptford to New Cross and he continued to work through the winter as an engineer at either the Arsenal or at the Maxim Gun Company, which was in Crayford.

Regarded as a sensitive and artistic person, Blythe was a talented violinist. He had played with a London music hall orchestra before his marriage, and afterwards with the Tonbridge Symphony Orchestra and other musical organisations in Kent. His preference was for classical music, especially that of Brahms and Mozart.

Blythe had epilepsy, the onset of which may have been during his teenage years. It was after his marriage in 1907 that there are records of his condition which may have been exacerbated by competing responsibilities at home and on the cricket field. Altham recounts how Blythe was "utterly exhausted" after the Headingley Test in 1907 when he took 15 wickets in the match.

Career summary
Blythe was active in first-class cricket for sixteen seasons from 1899 to 1914, playing in 439 matches. He delivered a total of 103,546 balls and achieved 4,796 maiden overs. He took 2,503 wickets at a cost of 42,094 runs which gave him an average of 16.81 runs per wicket. He took 5wI 218 times, 10wM 71 times and 100 wickets in a season 14 times. His best innings return was the 10 for 30 he achieved on 1 June 1907 at Northampton (see above) and his 17 for 48 that day was his best match return.

, Blythe is one of only 33 players who has taken 2,000 first-class career wickets and he is ranked 13th in the list, but he had a much shorter career than any of the first twelve. Among the bowlers with 2,000-plus wickets, his average of 16.81 is the sixth-best after those of Alfred Shaw, Schofield Haigh, Johnny Briggs, Brian Statham and Wilfred Rhodes.

In Test cricket, which for statistical purposes is part of first-class cricket, Blythe represented England nineteen times between December 1901 and March 1910, taking part in seven series. He delivered 4,456 balls and achieved 231 maiden overs. He took exactly 100 wickets at a cost of 1,863 runs for an average of 18.63. He took 5wI nine times and 10wM four times. His best innings return was eight for 59 at Headingley in 1907 and his 15 for 99 there was his best match return.

As a batsman, Blythe was never more than occasionally useful and was always a tail-ender who batted low in the order. He had 587 innings in his career and was not out in 137 of them, so he was dismissed 450 times. He scored 4,443 runs at an average of 9.87 per dismissal. He never scored a century but did achieve five half-centuries. His highest score was his innings of 82 not out at Trent Bridge in 1904. Like most specialist bowlers, Blythe fielded in the outfield and he held 206 career catches. He had 31 Test innings and was not out twelve times, scoring 183 runs at the average of 9.63. His highest Test score was 27 and he held six catches.

Notes

References

Bibliography
Altham HS (1962) A History of Cricket, vol. 1. London: George Allen & Unwin. 
Barker R, Rosenwater I (1969) England v Australia: A compendium of Test cricket between the countries 1877–1968. London: Batsford. 
Bates S (2017) 'The Real Colin Blythe', The Nightwatchman, vol.20 (Winter 2017), pp. 34–39.
Broom J (2022) Cricket in the First World War: Play up! Play the Game. Barnsley: Pen and Sword. 
Carlaw D (2020) Kent County Cricketers A to Z. Part One: 1806–1914 (revised edition). (Available online at The Association of Cricket Statisticians and Historians. Retrieved 21 December 2020.)
Croudy B (1995) Colin Blythe – Famous Cricketers Series, No.27. Nottingham: The Association of Cricket Statisticians and Historians.  (Available online. Retrieved 29 December 2018.)
Down M (1981) Archie: A Biography of A. C. MacLaren. London: George Allen & Unwin. 
Ellis C, Pennell M (2010) Trophies and Tribulations: Forty Years of Kent Cricket. London: Greenwich Publishing. 
Harris C, Whippy J (2008) The Greater Game: Sporting icons who fell during the Great War. Barnsley: Pen & Sword. 
Keating F (2007) A poignant reminder of the talents stolen from sport, The Guardian, 13 November 2011. Retrieved 6 April 2016.
Knight L, Oakes S (eds) (2019) Kent County Cricket Club Annual 2019. Canterbury: Kent County Cricket Club.
Lewis P (2014) For Kent and Country. Brighton: Reveille Press. 
Moore D (1988) The History of Kent County Cricket Club. London: Christopher Helm. 
Moseling M, Quarrington T (2013) A Half-Forgotten Triumph. Cheltenham: SportsBooks. 
Renshaw A (2014) Wisden on the Great War: The Lives of Cricket's Fallen 1914-1918. London: Bloomsbury.  (Available online. Retrieved 31 December 2020.)
Scoble CL (2005) Colin Blythe: Lament for a Legend. Cheltenham: SportsBooks. 
Smart JB (2009) The Real Colin Blythe. Kingsbridge: Blythe Smart Publications. 
Stern J, Williams M (eds) (2013) The Essential Wisden: An Anthology of 150 Years of Wisden Cricketers' Almanack. London: John Wisden & Co. 
Swanton EW, Plumptre G, Woodcock JC (eds) (1986) Barclay's World of Cricket, 3rd edition. London: Willow Books. 
 
 
 
Wilde S (2013) Wisden Cricketers of the Year: A Celebration of Cricket's Greatest Players. London: John Wisden & Co. 
Williams G (2015) Blythe, Colin (Charlie) (1879–1917), Oxford Dictionary of National Biography, online edition. Oxford: Oxford University Press. Retrieved 1 January 2019. 
 Woolley F (1936) The King of Games. London: Stanley Paul.
Wynne-Thomas P (1989) The Complete History of Cricket Tours at Home and Abroad. London: Hamlyn.

External links

1879 births
1917 deaths
British Army personnel of World War I
British military personnel killed in World War I
Cricketers who have taken ten wickets in an innings
England Test cricketers
English cricketers of 1890 to 1918
English cricketers
Kent cricketers
King's Own Yorkshire Light Infantry soldiers
Marylebone Cricket Club cricketers
North v South cricketers
People from Deptford
People with epilepsy
Players cricketers
Wisden Cricketers of the Year
Burials at Oxford Road Commonwealth War Graves Commission Cemetery
Marylebone Cricket Club Australian Touring Team cricketers
Marylebone Cricket Club South African Touring Team cricketers